The  Dallas Texans season was the second season for the Texans. They finished with a record of 4–6.

Regular season

Schedule

Standings

y – clinched regular-season title

x – clinched playoff spot

Roster

Awards

External links
1991 Dallas Texans on ArenaFan

Dallas Texans
Dallas Texans
Dallas Texans (Arena) seasons